Gino Giaroli (27 June 1924, Reggio Emilia – 23 May 1991, Reggio Emilia) was an Italian footballer, active mainly during the 1950s. He is the second all-time capped player of Palermo in Serie A, with 151 caps, many as club captain.

Career
Giaroli was born in Reggio Emilia in 1924, and took part in World War II as a private soldier in the Italian Navy on the Italian cruiser Bolzano.

In the aftermath of the Armistice of Cassibile, the cruiser was left afloat by Italian and Allies forces in order to prevent the Germans, who have occupied nearer La Spezia to reuse it, while the serving soldiers were left without any order. Giaroli and other Italians were captured by Wehrmacht in Marseille and taken to Germany, where they were freed by American forces at the end of the war.

At the end of the war, Giaroli returned to its native town and came through the youth ranks of Reggiana, becoming a starter for its local club for four seasons thanks to the appreciation of Hungarian managers János Vanicsek and Árpád Hajós.

He was bought by Palermo in 1949, where he spent six seasons, becoming the team captain and an iconic figure in the history of the Sicilian club. During his tenure with the "rosanero", he played with Şükrü Gülesin, Čestmír Vycpálek, Aredio Gimona, Ferruccio Santamaria and Enrique Martegani among others; the club was owned by count Raimondo Lanzia di Trabia, who refused to sell Giaroli to A.C. Milan. 
During the time in Palermo, he was capped by the Italian national team B.

Giaroli transferred to Veneto side Lanerossi Vicenza, where he spent four seasons.

After his retirement in 1958, Giaroli started to coach in Reggiana youth teams.

He managed in Schio, Como, Pistoia and Carpi, and later opened some businesses in Reggio Emilia.
He died of cancer in 1991.

References 
http://ricerca.repubblica.it/repubblica/archivio/repubblica/2010/03/14/giaroli-gol-ed-quarto-posto.html

Italian footballers
1924 births
1991 deaths
Association football defenders
Sportspeople from Reggio Emilia
Regia Marina personnel of World War II
Italian prisoners of war
Italy B international footballers
A.C. Reggiana 1919 players
L.R. Vicenza players
Palermo F.C. players
Serie A players
Italian football managers
Deaths from cancer in Emilia-Romagna
Como 1907 managers
A.C. Carpi managers
U.S. Pistoiese 1921 managers
Footballers from Emilia-Romagna